The following is a list of indoor arenas in Serbia (excluding Kosovo). The minimum required capacity is 1,000.

List of indoor arenas

List of indoor swimming pool arenas

List of indoor ice rinks

See also
 List of indoor arenas in Europe
 List of indoor arenas by capacity

References

External links
 Adresar sportskih centara Srbije

Serbia
Basketball venues in Serbia
Indoor arenas